Khurshid Begum Saeed is a Pakistani politician who served as member of the National Assembly of Pakistan.

Political career
She was elected to the National Assembly of Pakistan as a candidate of Awami National Party on a seat reserved for women from Khyber Pakhtunkhwa in the 2008 Pakistani general election.

She ran for the seat of National Assembly as a candidate of Awami National Party from NA-14 constituency in the 2013 Pakistani general election but was unsuccessful.

References

Pakistani MNAs 2008–2013
Living people
Year of birth missing (living people)